This is a list of Australian films of the 1970s. For a complete alphabetical list, see :Category:Australian films.

1970
 List of Australian films of 1970

1971
 List of Australian films of 1971

1972
 List of Australian films of 1972

1973
 List of Australian films of 1973

1974
 List of Australian films of 1974

1975
 List of Australian films of 1975

1976
 List of Australian films of 1976

1977
 List of Australian films of 1977

1978
 List of Australian films of 1978

1979
 List of Australian films of 1979

External links
 Australian film at the Internet Movie Database

Australian
Films